Oto is a village located in the municipality of Broto, Province of Huesca, Aragon, Spain.

References 

Populated places in the Province of Huesca